The World War II Memorial by artist Simon Kogan is installed on the Washington State Capitol campus in Olympia, Washington, United States. The memorial, dedicated on May 28, 1999, is made of bronze, melted torpedo railings, granite, and stone.

References

1999 establishments in Washington (state)
Monuments and memorials in Olympia, Washington
Outdoor sculptures in Olympia, Washington
Washington State Capitol campus
World War II memorials in the United States
Bronze sculptures in Washington (state)
Granite sculptures in Washington (state)
Stone sculptures in Washington (state)